Vadinamma is an Indian Telugu-language television drama series which airs on Star Maa and streams on Disney+ Hotstar . The series premiered on 6 May 2019. This is a remake of Tamil series Pandian Stores airing on Star Vijay . It stars Sujitha (reprising her role from original), Prabhakar, Rajesh Dutta, Maheshwari, Raj and Priyanka. After running for three years the serial ended on March 21st 2022.

Plot
It mainly focuses on the unity of a joint family headed by Sita and Raghuram, after the entry of new daughters-in-law, Shailu, Siri and Shilpa.

Cast

Main
  Sujitha Dhanush as Seetha Mahalakshmi: Raghuram's wife; Lakshman, Bharat and Nani's sister-in-law; Susheela's daughter; Bhaskar's younger sister; Rishi's mother (Main Lead)
 Prabhakar as Raghuram: Seetha's husband; Lakshman, Bharat and Nani's elder step-brother; Rajeshwari's step-son; Rishi's father
 Sravan Rajesh Dutta / Unknown as Lakshman: Raghuram's first younger step-brother; Rajeshwari's elder son; Bharat and Nani's elder brother; Shailu's husband; Rishi's adoptive father
 Maheshwari as Shailaja 'Shailu': Lakshman's wife; Rishi's adoptive mother; Janardhan and Subadhra's daughter 
 Raj as Bharat: Raghuram's second younger step-brother; Rajeshwari's son; Nani's elder brother; Lakshman's younger brother; Siri's husband; Vaidehi's father 
 Priyanka Naidu as Siri: Bharat's wife; Parvathi and Satyamurthy's daughter; Vaidehi's mother 
 Ganesh Reddy as Nani: Shilpa's husband; Raghuram's younger step-brother; Bharat and Lakshman's younger brother; Rajeshwari's younger son 
 Suji Thammishetty as Shilpa: Nani's wife; Kalpana and Kishore's younger sister; Damayanti and Rajasekhar's daughter

Recurring
 Sujatha Reddy as 
 Rajeshwari: Gowri Shankar's widowed wife; Lakshman, Bharat and Nani's mother; Raghu's step-mother; Vaidehi and Rishi's paternal grandmother (2019–present)
 Shiva Parvathy (2019-2020) / Rajyalakshmi (2020) / Nirmala Reddy (2020–present) as 
 Parvathy: Siri's mother; Vaidehi's maternal grandmother; Lakshman, Bharat and Nani's aunt; Raghu's step-aunt (2019-2020)
Bhargav Rao as
Sathyamurthy: Siri's father; Vaidehi's maternal grandfather; Lakshman, Bharat and Nani's uncle; Raghu's step-uncle
 Chitram Seenu as 
 Papa Rao: Vijaya's husband; Baby's father; Raghuram's cousin brother-in-law (2020)
 Usha Sri as 
 Vijaya: Papa Rao's wife; Baby's mother; Raghuram's cousin sister (2020)
 Rajendra as 
 MLA Janardhan: Subadhra's husband; Shailu's father (2019–present)
 Kondaveeti Sangeetha as
 Damayanti: Shilpa, Kalpana and Kishore's mother (2021–present)
 Naveena as 
 Subadhra: Janardhan's wife; Shailu's mother (2019–present)
 Manjula Paritala as 
 Amrutha: Raghuram's relative and fake wife; Varshita's mother (2020-2021)
 Unknown as 
 Kishore: Kalpana's younger brother; Shilpa's elder brother; Damayanti's son (2021–present)
 Baby Nandhita as 
 Varshita: Amrutha's daughter and Raghuram's fake daughter (2020-2021)
 Unknown as
 Sushela
 Kalpana: Avinash's wife; Shilpa and Kishore's elder sister; Damayanti's daughter (2021–present)
 Vijay Bhargav as 
 Bhaskar: Seetha's elder brother; Durga's husband; Raghuram's best friend (2019–present)
 Madhulika as 
 Durga: Bhaskar's wife; Seetha's sister-in-law; Parvathy's niece (2019–present)
 Unknown as 
 Avinash: Damayanti's son-in-law; Kalpana's husband (2021–present)

Cameo Appearance 

 Amardeep Chowdary as Rama
 Sreeharsha Chaganti as Abhi
 Baby Krithika as Young Seetha
 Master Shourya as Young Lakshman
 Master Chakri as Young Bharath
 Krishna Koushik as Raja Gopal
 Madhavi Latha as Raja Gopal's wife

Production
In late March 2020, the production and broadcasting of the series halted along with all other Indian television series and films owing COVID-19 outbreak in India. It resumed after three months in June 2020.

Reception

Critics
The Times of India stated, "The old wine in a new bottle that celebrates middle class family emotions has struck a chord with the masses."

Viewership and ratings
The series became one of the top five watched Telugu GEC after its time change from afternoon 3:00 pm (IST) to night 7:00 pm (IST) in June 2019 until again being shifted from 7:00 pm in week 49, 2020 despite being in top 3. As in December 2019, it was at second position with ratings more than about 15 TVR after Karthika Deepam.

References

External links 

 
 Vadinamma on Disney+ Hotstar

Star Maa original programming
Indian television soap operas
Serial drama television series
2019 Indian television series debuts
Telugu-language television shows
Telugu-language television series based on Tamil-language television series